Roman Bazan (19 August 1938 – 20 June 2012) was a Polish footballer. He played in 21 matches for the Poland national football team from 1963 to 1968.

References

External links
 

1938 births
2012 deaths
Polish footballers
Poland international footballers
Association football defenders
Śląsk Wrocław players
Zagłębie Sosnowiec players